Modeling is:
 a method used in certain cognitive-behavioral techniques of psychotherapy whereby the client learns by imitation alone, without any specific verbal direction by the therapist, and
 a general process in which persons serve as models for others, exhibiting the behavior to be imitated by the others This process is most commonly discussed with respect to children in developmental psychology.

The word modeling refers both to the behavior of the learner and the teacher.

Study by Albert Bandura 

The concept of behavioral modeling was most memorably introduced by Albert Bandura in his famous 1961 Bobo doll experiment. In this study, 72 children from ages three to five were divided into groups to watch an adult confederate interact with an assortment of toys in the experiment room, including an inflated Bobo doll. For children assigned the non-aggressive condition, the confederate ignored the doll. For children assigned the aggressive condition, the confederate spent the majority of the time physically aggressing the doll and shouting at it.

After the confederate left the room, the children were given the opportunity to individually interact with similar toys. Children who observed the non-aggressive confederate's behavior played quietly with the toys and rarely initiated violence toward the Bobo doll. Children who watched the aggressive confederate were more likely to imitate the confederate's behavior by hitting, kicking, and shouting at the Bobo doll.

Factors influencing behavioral modeling

Psychological factors 
Bandura proposed that four components contribute to behavioral modeling.

 Attention: The observer must watch and pay attention the behavior being modeled.
 Retention: The observer must remember the behavior well enough to recreate it.
 Reproduction: The observer must physically recreate the actions they observed in step 1.
 Reinforcement: The observer's modeled behavior must be rewarded

Neurological factors 
The mirror neuron system, located in the frontal lobe of the brain, is a network of neurons that become active when an animal either performs a behavior or observes that behavior being performed by another. For example, the same mirror neurons will become active when a monkey grasps an object as when it watches another monkey do so. While the significance of mirror neurons is still up for debate in the scientific community, there are many who believe them to be the primary biological component in imitative learning.

In neuro-linguistic programming 

Modeling is an important component of neuro-linguistic programming (NLP), which field has developed specialized techniques involving modeling.

See also
 Cognitive imitation
 Mimicry
 Mirror neuron
 Social cognition

References

Behavioral concepts